Sini Häkkinen (born 1990) is a Finnish volley-ball player. Her playing position is wing spiker. She has played 11 times with the Finnish national female volley-ball team. The clubs she has played for include Pihtiputaan Ploki, Pislaploki and LP Viesti Salo. She is right-handed and 1.83 m tall.

References

1990 births
Living people
Finnish women's volleyball players
Sportspeople from Helsinki
21st-century Finnish women